The 1944 St. Louis Cardinals season was the team's 63rd season in St. Louis, Missouri and the 53rd season in the National League. The Cardinals went 105–49 during the season and finished 1st in the National League. In the World Series, they met their town rivals, the St. Louis Browns. They won the series in 6 games.

Regular season
Shortstop Marty Marion won the MVP Award this year, batting .267, with 6 home runs and 63 RBIs. This was the third consecutive year a Cardinal won the MVP Award, with Mort Cooper winning in 1942 and Stan Musial winning in 1943. Marion was the first shortstop in the history of the National League to win the award.

Season standings

Record vs. opponents

Roster

Player stats

Batting

Starters by position
Note: Pos = Position; G = Games played; AB = At bats; H = Hits; Avg. = Batting average; HR = Home runs; RBI = Runs batted in

Other batters
Note: G = Games played; AB = At bats; H = Hits; Avg. = Batting average; HR = Home runs; RBI = Runs batted in

Pitching

Starting pitchers
Note: G = Games pitched; IP = Innings pitched; W = Wins; L = Losses; ERA = Earned run average; SO = Strikeouts

Other pitchers
Note: G = Games pitched; IP = Innings pitched; W = Wins; L = Losses; ERA = Earned run average; SO = Strikeouts

Relief pitchers
Note: G = Games pitched; W = Wins; L = Losses; SV = Saves; ERA = Earned run average; SO = Strikeouts

1944 World Series 

NL St. Louis Cardinals (4) vs. AL St. Louis Browns (2)

Farm system

LEAGUE CHAMPIONS: Lynchburg

References

External links
1944 St. Louis Cardinals at Baseball Reference
1944 St. Louis Cardinals team page at www.baseball-almanac.com

St. Louis Cardinals seasons
Saint Louis Cardinals season
National League champion seasons
World Series champion seasons
St. Louis Cardinals